Honor to serve Riga! (GKR) is a municipal political party located in Riga, Latvia. It was created on March 17, 2012 and is led by Andris Ameriks, the former deputy mayor of Riga.

In 2013 the party entered an electoral alliance with the centre-left Harmony party to participate in the Riga municipal election. The joint Harmony/GKR list won 58.5% and 39 seats, of which Proud to serve Riga received 15. Together the two parties control the Riga City Council. From 2004–2011 Andris Ameriks was a member of the Riga Council for the Latvia's First Party and thereafter Latvia's First Party/Latvian Way, a party of centre-right orientation. The majority of party members were former deputies of the LFP/LW fraction in Riga City Council.

In the 2020 Riga City Council election GKR ran separately from Harmony due to a previous breakup of their alliance, winning five seats and a later becoming a member of the opposition.

The only representative of the party in the Saeima is Jūlija Stepaņenko, elected from the Harmony list in the 2018 parliamentary election.

For the 2022 Latvian parliamentary election, members of the party (e.g. Burovs) are running as candidates under the Latvia First party ticket.

References

External links 
 Official website 

Political parties in Latvia